Christopher Jackson (born 25 October 1996) is a Liberian footballer who plays as a forward.

Club career

Early career 
Born in Montserrado County, Jackson started his playing career at community based fourth division club, Shooting Stars Football Club. After a year with Shooting Stars, Jackson went signed with Montserrado County-based third division club Manchester City, which is named after Premier League club. The young striker spent two years with Manchester City in the Liberia Third Division League.

Keitrace FC 
In 2013, Christopher Jackson signed a three-year deal with second division side, Keitrace FC. His ten goals in 19 appearances helped Keitrace FC gain promotion to the top tier of Liberian football, the First Division.

LISCR FC 
After a year with Keitrace, Jackson made a move to Liberian Premier League club LISCR FC. Jackson went on to score ten goals in 18 appearances in his first season. He led the team to the final of the 2015 Liberian First Division League season, where LISCR FC lost to Nimba United Football Club on penalty shootouts. The following season, Jackson managed to score eight times from 17 appearances as LISCR FC struggled under new coach, Robert Lartey. Under the guidance of the Gambian coach Tapha Manneh, Jackson won his first league title, playing a key role in club's of longest unbeaten run in Liberian football. Jackson scored 13 goals in 25 appearances to help LISCR FC finish the 2016-17 league season unbeaten and also winning the Liberian Cup to complete the double.

Shakhtyor Soligorsk 
In early 2018, Jackson left LISCR FC and traveled to Belarus to attend tryouts with Belarusian Premier League club Shakhtyor Soligorsk. In February, LISCR FC announced that they agreed a deal with FC Shakhtyor Soligorsk for a free transfer of Jackson.

International goals
Scores and results list Liberia's goal tally first.

Honors

Club 
 LISCR FC
Winner
 Liberia First Division: 2016–17
 Liberian Cup: 2016–17

References

External links
 
 

1996 births
Living people
Liberian footballers
Liberia international footballers
People from Montserrado County
LISCR FC players
FC Shakhtyor Soligorsk players
Kelantan FA players
Belarusian Premier League players
Liberian expatriate footballers
Expatriate footballers in Belarus
Expatriate footballers in Malaysia
Liberian expatriate sportspeople in Belarus
Liberian expatriate sportspeople in Malaysia
Association football forwards